Ali Sabieh is the second largest city in Djibouti. It sprawls on a wide basin surrounded by granitic mountains on all sides. The famous landmark of Ali Sabieh is located near the city.

History

Ali Sabieh was a small village when the French created their French Somaliland. During the Middle Ages, it was ruled by the Ifat and Adal Sultanates subsequently came under Ottoman and French protection in the 18th century. According to an old legend, the present-day territory of Ali Sabieh was covered by some trees, wadis and a well. Where the nomadics use to stopping here for water on the way to the towns of Zeila or Harar and after the signing treaties in 1894 with the then ruling Ugaas of Issa Somali, to established a protectorate in the region referred to as French Somaliland. Ali Sabieh became an administrative and commercial centre in the 19th century after the construction of the Ethio-Djibouti Railways, the first railway in French Somaliland. The railway reached this location on 14 July 1900. During all this time, Ali Sabieh was practically the town profited much and became a "boom city", attracting most of the trade. In 1904, a report notes that "when the border post of Ali Sabieh, it has the appearance of a fortress. Attached to the circle of "Gobad-Dikkil" from its inception in 1931, Ali Sabieh became the chief town of a circle autonomously 1939.

During World War II, Italy's declaration of war on France and Great Britain came on 10 June 1940. The Italians did undertake some offensive actions beginning on 18 June. From Harrar Governorate, troops under General Guglielmo Nasi attacked the fort of Ali-Sabieh, there was some skirmishing over the Ethio-Djibouti Railways. Between 1 and 10 July several clashes with the Italians took place at Ali-Sabieh and along the railroad. When the government on 10 July learned that the armistice was not yet put into effect in French Somaliland, President Philippe Pétain a collaborationist government at Vichy sent General Gaëtan Germain as his personal representative to correct the situation. Negotiations at Dewele, Italian East Africa on the local implementation of the armistice were only finally completed on 8 August. When the Italian invasion of British Somaliland the territory was completely surrounded on land by Italian possessions.

The Commander-in-Chief, East Africa, William Platt, codenamed the negotiations for the surrender of French Somaliland "Pentagon", because there were five sides: himself, the Vichy governor, the Free French, the British minister at Addis Ababa and the United States. Christian Raimond Dupont surrendered and Colonel Raynal's troops crossed back into French Somaliland on 26 December 1942, completing its liberation. The official handover took place at 10:00 p.m. on 28 December. The first governor appointed under the Free French was André Bayardelle. He was briefly attached to the circle of Djibouti between 1946 and 1949. It is managed by the commander of the circle Dikhil between 1952 and 1958, before finally receive its own administration.

Following the conclusion of the 1977-1978 Ogaden War, Ali Sabieh, along with Dikhil, accommodated three quarters of the 8,000 Issa Somalis who had fled Ethiopia.

Overview

Ali Sabieh is the capital of the Ali Sabieh Region. It lies along National Highway 5.

Nearby towns and villages include Dikhil (50 km), Arta (69 km), Ali Adde (22 km), Assamo (24 km), Dewele (18 km), Dasbiyo (15 km), Holhol (33 km) and Guelile (10 km). Public buses go from Djibouti City to Ali Sabieh. It takes two hours to get to Ali Sabieh. A contracted bus ride from Djibouti city to Ali Sabieh can charge between 700 Djiboutian franc. Ali Sabieh's central location has contributed to its economic revival. Goods travelling to other parts of Djibouti all depart from the city's outskirts.

Demographics
, the population of Ali Sabieh has been estimated to be 147,987. The city inhabitants belong to various mainly Afro-Asiatic-speaking ethnic groups, with the Issa Somali predominant. Ali Sabieh is the second largest cities of Djibouti after Djibouti city with about 250,547 residents.

Sports

Ali has two soccer fields and one basketball court. One of the football fields has a capacity of 1,500 spectators. It is home to the Djibouti Super Football League's Ali Sabieh FC.

Economy
Ali Sabieh economy today relies on tourism, agriculture and a number of small factories, most of which are involved in the building trade. The city was visited by more than 2,000 tourists over the years. For its famous landmark Ali Sabieh Mountain of national emblem of Djibouti symbol and for the Arrei Mountains highest point in Ali Sabieh region.

Education
There are several state-run owned secondary and high schools in the city. Among these is the premiere secondary school in the capital region. Many primary schools and nurseries are also found in the town.

Transport

The fact that Ali Sabieh is not near a large navigable body of water has meant that ground transportation has been the most important method of transporting people and goods in and out of the town. Ali Sabieh has benefited from its railway location between Addis Ababa and Djibouti City. There is a colonial-era station in Ali Sabieh for the Ethio-Djibouti Railways.  There is also a new station on the standard-gauge Addis Ababa-Djibouti Railway.

Paved roads are available in Ali Sabieh, The vast majority of the roads were paved by the French, during colonial rule. The local government has repaired some of the roads but many others are still awaiting repair. There are also other buses and shared taxis that goes to other cities in Djibouti.

Geography

Ali Sabieh is located in a valley in the southern section of the country. The city is situated in a mountainous area, in an enclosed valley of the highlands. Ali Sabieh is a mountainous and hilly town. This altitude gives the settlement and the surrounding area a milder climate than the Djibouti city coastal area, where the weather is typically hot. The city's layout is partially scattered and irregular. Houses are generally single storey and mostly cement made. To the east of Ali Sabieh is a grassland savannah, which attracts many types of wildlife to the area, including black-backed jackal, dorcas gazelle, Felis, caracal, various bird species, and the hamadryas baboon. Due to its location at 756 metres (2,480 ft) above sea level, Ali Sabieh's climate is moderate in summer and cold in winter. The area attracts visitors looking for a moderate climate and pristine, scenic views.

Climate
Ali Sabieh is sweltering during summer and very warm during winter. There are two rainy seasons. The first rainy season extends from March to April and second from July to September. From November to March, the town experiences the warm winter season. It heats up from June to October, though the nights are cooler.

Elevation is the major factor in temperature levels.

Ali Sabieh has a hot arid climate (BWh) by the Köppen-Geiger system.

Notable people
Aden Robleh Awaleh: Politician and president of the National Democratic Party (PND).
Mahmoud Harbi: Politician
Hussein Ahmed Salah: Djiboutian long-distance runner
Aden Farah Samatar: Djiboutian musician
Moumina Houssein Darar: Djiboutian Anti-Terrorism Police Investigator.
Aicha Bogoreh: First lady of Djibouti
Abdi Ibrahim (Bow Bow): Djiboutian musician
Kadra Ahmed Hassan: Djibouti's Permanent Representative to the United Nations and the World Trade Organization.
Nima Djama: Djiboutian musician
Abdo Hamargod: Djiboutian musician

Sister towns

See also 

 Railway stations in Djibouti

References 

Populated places in Djibouti
Ali Sabieh Region